"All Is Fair in Love and War" is a song written by Tim Nichols and Robert Byrne, and recorded by American country music artist Ronnie Milsap.  It was released in February 1992 as the fourth single from his album Back to the Grindstone.  The song reached number 11 on the Billboard Hot Country Singles & Tracks chart in June 1992.

Chart performance

References

1992 singles
Ronnie Milsap songs
RCA Records Nashville singles
Songs written by Tim Nichols
Songs written by Robert Byrne (songwriter)
1991 songs